Battle of Quang Tri can refer to
Battle of Quang Tri (1968),  Tet Offensive
First Battle of Quang Tri, 1972 Easter Offensive
Second Battle of Quang Tri, 1972 Easter Offensive